Dacryodes incurvata is a tree in the family Burseraceae. The specific epithet  is from the Latin meaning "bending inward", referring to the leaflet margin.

Description
The bark is grey-brown and smooth.

Distribution and habitat
Dacryodes incurvata grows naturally in Sumatra, Peninsular Malaysia, Borneo and the Philippines. Its habitat is mixed dipterocarp forests from sea-level to  altitude, or occasionally in peat swamp forests.

References

incurvata
Trees of Malesia
Plants described in 1883